The Providence Friars men's basketball team represents Providence College in NCAA Division I competition. They were a founding member of the original Big East Conference from 1979 until 2013, and are now a member of the current Big East Conference. They play their home games at the Amica Mutual Pavilion  in Providence, Rhode Island. Since 2011, the head coach is Ed Cooley.

The Friars have made two Final Four appearances in the NCAA Division I men's basketball tournament, in 1973 and 1987. Four former players or coaches — Dave Gavitt, John Thompson, Rick Pitino, and Lenny Wilkens — are enshrined in the Naismith Memorial Basketball Hall of Fame. In addition, two-time NCAA Division I men's basketball tournament champion, current Chicago Bulls head coach Billy Donovan, helped lead the Friars (as a player) to the Final Four in 1987.

History

Early years: 1921-1955
Providence Friars basketball can be traced back to 1921, when the four-year-old school fielded its first basketball team on an informal basis. This first team only lasted two years, however, and did not return until the 1926–27 season when Archie Golembeski, the school's football coach, led to the team to a win over St. John's before devoting his time to football the next year. He was replaced by Al McClellan, who coached the team to four New England championships — 1929, 1930, 1932, and 1935 — and had an overall winning percentage over .700. In 1938, McClellan left and was replaced by Ed Crotty, who led the team to a 15–5 record in 1942–43 before the team suspended play the next year after the outbreak of World War II. After the war, the NCAA divided its teams into two divisions, the University Division and the College Division; with a smaller enrollment and no home court (the team played in an on-campus auditorium and then local high school gyms), the Friars were placed into the College Division and no longer faced the opponents they once played.

Mullaney era: 1955-1969
In 1949, Vin Cuddy was hired as the team's head coach, leading the team to a 14–9 record in his first season and qualified for the NAIB regional tournament in 1951, behind the school's first 1,000-point scorer, Jim Schlimm. By 1955, Cuddy's record fell to 9–12 and he was replaced by Joe Mullaney; at the same time, the school opened its first on-campus gym, Alumni Hall. In 1959, Mullaney and the Friars defeated ranked Villanova on the road, leading to their first-ever National Invitational Tournament bid.

The Friars reached the NIT Finals in 1960 with future hall-of-famer Lenny Wilkens being named MVP in his senior season before winning the tournament in 1961 behind Vin Ernst, John Egan, and Jim Hadnot. Two years later, led by another future hall of famer, John Thompson, as well as future Boston Mayor Ray Flynn, the Friars won their second NIT title. With a 24–2 record in 1964–65, the number four ranked Friars reached the Elite Eight of the NCAA Division I men's basketball tournament. In 1966–67, Jimmy Walker led the nation in scoring and became the school's first 2,000-point scorer as well as the first New England player selected first overall in the NBA draft. That season also marked the last in Mullaney's run of nine consecutive 20-win seasons. Two years later, Mullaney was hired as the head coach of the Los Angeles Lakers of the NBA.

Gavitt era: 1969-1979
Following Mullaney's departure, Dave Gavitt, an assistant under Mullaney who then became head coach at Dartmouth, took over as the Friars' head coach in 1969. In his second year, Gavitt began a string of eight consecutive 20-win seasons. For the 1972–73 season, the team began playing in downtown Providence at the brand-new 12,000-seat arena, the Providence Civic Center (renamed the Dunkin' Donuts Center in 2001). That season was the Friars' best to date; led by Ernie DiGregorio and the troubled center Marvin Barnes, the team went on a 17-team game winning streak that ended in a Final Four loss to Memphis State. The next year, the Friars posted a 28–4 record and made their second straight Sweet Sixteen appearance. The team continued its top-flight status with back-to-back 20-win seasons in 1976–77 and 1977–78, earning NCAA Tournament bids each year, one coming after defeating top-ranked Michigan in 1976. After a 10–16 season in 1978–79, Gavitt left Providence to become the first commissioner of the Providence-based Big East Conference. He finished his 10-year career at Providence with a 209–84 (.713) record.

Mullaney returns: 1979-1985
After spending the first six decades of their existence as an independent, the Friars joined the Big East in its inaugural season, 1979–80. The conference originally consisted of Providence, Boston College, Georgetown, St. John's, Seton Hall, Syracuse, and Connecticut. New head coach Gary Walters led the team to an 11–16 record in 1979–80, and was replaced by Mullaney in 1981. His next stint with the Friars would not be as successful, and consisted of only one winning season (1983–84, behind Otis Thorpe) against three losing.

Pitino era: 1985-1987
In 1985, New York Knicks assistant coach Rick Pitino was hired as the latest Friars head coach. In his first season the Friars compiled a 17–14 record and made their first NIT appearance in a decade. The next year, 1986–87, the Friars posted a 25–9 record behind Billy Donovan and made their second-ever Final Four appearance in the 1987 NCAA Division I men's basketball tournament. After losing to Syracuse, Pitino left the school and re-joined the Knicks as their head coach in 1987. The Friars have not returned to the Final Four since Pitino's departure.

Chiesa, Barnes, Gillen: 1987-1998

In 1987–88, the Friars posted a losing record under new head coach Gordie Chiesa, who was replaced by Rick Barnes after the season. Behind Barnes and 2,000-point scorer Eric Murdock, the Friars made back-to-back NCAA Tournament appearances in 1989 and 1990, as well as an NIT bid in 1991. Following Murdock's departure and a losing season in 1991–92, the team had an NIT semifinal appearance in 1993 and an NCAA tournament appearance in 1994, while also capturing the school's first Big East Tournament title. Following back-to-back 20-win seasons, Barnes left to become the head coach at Clemson in 1994. He was replaced by Pete Gillen. Led by Eric Williams, the Friars made consecutive NIT appearances in 1995 and 1996. In 1996–97, the Friars posted a 24–12 record, led by Austin Croshere and Jamel Thomas. After defeating Duke in the 1997 NCAA Division I men's basketball tournament, the Friars reached the Elite Eight before losing, in overtime, to eventual champion Arizona. Following a losing season in 1997–98, Gillen departed to become the head coach at Virginia.

Welsh era: 1998-2008
Gillen was replaced by Iona head coach Tim Welsh in 1998. Led by Thomas, the Friars made an NIT bid in 1999. The team returned to the NCAA tournament two years later, posting a 21–10 record behind John Linehan. While the Friars posted a losing record in Linehan's senior season in 2001–02, the guard broke Allen Iverson's single-season Big East steals record of 67 as well as Murdock's NCAA career steals record of 377. Led by Ryan Gomes, the Friars returned to the NIT with an 18–14 record in 2002–03 and made another NCAA appearance in 2003–04 with a 20–9 record. However, Welsh's next four teams, without Gomes after 2004–05, recorded one winning season, and Welsh was fired following the 2007–08 season.

Davis era: 2008-2011
In 2008, the Friars hired Drake head coach Keno Davis, who won the National Coach of the Year Award in his first and only season as Drake's head coach. Davis' team posted a 19–14 record, including a win at home over top-ranked Pittsburgh, in 2008–09 en route to an NIT appearance. In 2009–10, Davis' team lost their final 11 games to finish 15th in the Big East. The Friars averaged 82 points per game, the fourth highest in Division I, while also surrendering 85 points per conference game, the worst statistical performance in Big East history. In Davis' third season, 2010–11, the Friars finished 14th in the conference despite having Division I's second-leading scorer in Marshon Brooks. Davis was fired after the 2010–11 season.

Cooley era: 2011-present

On March 22, 2011, the Friars hired Fairfield head coach Ed Cooley, as the 15th head coach in program history. A Providence native, Cooley brought a reinvigorated energy surrounding the program and recruited six consensus Top 100 recruits in his first three years.

2011–12 Season
In his first season at Providence, Cooley led the Friars to a 15–17 mark overall, posting an 11–3 mark (8–0 at home) in non-conference action and going 4–14 in the Big East. That season, point guard Vincent Council was named All-Big East Third Team and forward LaDontae Henton earned Big East All-Rookie Team accolades.

2012–13 Season — NIT Quarterfinals
In his second season, Cooley led the Friars to a 19–15 record overall and a 9–9 mark in league play. Included in the 9–9 Big East record in 2012–13 was a 7–2 mark over the last nine games of the conference season, marking the second best turnaround over second half of the season in Big East history. The Friars played the season with a short roster with transfers Carson Desrosier and Tyler Harris having to sit out the year per NCAA transfer rules, five star Freshman shooting guard and Providence native Ricky Ledo sitting our per NCAA eligibility issues, and five star Freshman point guard Kris Dunn sitting out the first semester with a shoulder injury.  Friars Freshman guard Josh Fortune, was the only incoming player in 2012–2013 season eligible to compete.  Cooley guided the Friars to the NIT where the squad posted a 2–1 record, beating Charlotte and Robert Morris before losing in the quarterfinals to eventual NIT Champion Baylor. That season, combo guard Bryce Cotton was named All-Big East First Team and Kadeem Batts was recognized as a co-winner of the league's Most Improved Award and earned All-Big East Honorable Mention accolades. After spending one year at Providence without being able to play, Ledo declared for the 2013 NBA Draft and was drafted by the Minnesota Timberwolves, eventually being traded to the Dallas Mavericks.

2013–14 Season — Big East tournament champions / NCAA tournament 1st round
In his third season at Providence, Cooley led the Friars to a 10–8 mark in the Big East Conference and finished tied for 3rd with Xavier and St. John's.  Transfers, Junior forward Carson Desrosiers and Sophomore forward Tyler Harris, were eligible to play their first season in black and white, having sat out the NCAA-enforced one-year period. However, in addition to former Senior point guard Vincent Council's graduation and Ricky Ledo entering the draft, Sophomore point guard Kris Dunn faced another shoulder injury and had to sit out almost the entire year as a medical redshirt, Cleveland State transfer Sophomore guard Junior Lamomba had to sit out the NCAA-enforced one-year period, and incoming Freshmen Brandon Austin and Rodney Bullock were suspended for the entire season due to an unspecified violation of team rules.  The Friars finished the season at 23–12 overall, the most wins in a season since 1996–1997. Two players received regular season honors, Senior point guard Bryce Cotton was named All-Big East First Team and Senior forward Kadeem Batts earned All-Big East Second Team accolades. Entering the Big East Tournament, the Friars played as the 4th seed due to losing the tie-breaker with Xavier. They defeated St. John's in the Quarterfinals, Seton Hall in the semifinals, and Creighton in the thrilling final at Madison Square Garden, claiming PC's second tournament title in Big East history. By winning the Big East Tournament the team earned an automatic bid, removing any "bubble" fears.  On their way to making history as the first tournament champion of the reconfigured league, Junior forward Ladontae Henton was named to the All-Tournament Team and Senior guard Bryce Cotton was named the tournaments Most Outstanding Player. On selection Sunday, the Friars were given the 11th seed in the 2014 NCAA tournament East Regional and faced the UNC.  The Friars lost 77–79, but en route Bryce Cotton scored a career high 36 points, making him the 4th all-time leading scorer in Providence College basketball history. Despite the loss, the season marked yet another major step forward by Ed Cooley & Co. in rebuilding the PC basketball program.

2021–2022 Season — Big East regular season champions / NCAA tournament
After a disappointing campaign the previous season marred by a Covid-19 shortened schedule and no fans, Ed Cooley led the Friars to their first regular season championship in Big East History with an overall record of 24-4 and 14-3 within the conference. The Friars clinched the title at home in front of a sold out Dunkin Donuts Center crowd. The Friars spent most of this season ranked in the AP and Coaches top 25 Polls reaching as high as 8/9 on Feb 14, 2022.

Current team

Roster

Coaching Staff

Season-by-season

Postseason

NCAA tournament results
The Friars have appeared in the NCAA tournament 22 times. Their combined record is 17–23.

NIT results
The Friars have appeared in the National Invitation Tournament (NIT) 20 times. Their combined record is 32–21. They are two time NIT Champions (1961, 1963).

NAIA tournament results
The Friars have appeared in the NAIA Tournament once. Their record is 0–1.

Former Friars

NCAA Men's Basketball All-Americans

NBA
G Kris Dunn, Utah Jazz
 G David Duke Jr., Brooklyn Nets

NBA G League
G Brandon Austin, Reno Bighorns — G League affiliate of Sacramento Kings
G LaDontae Henton, Agua Caliente Clippers — G League affiliate of Los Angeles Clippers
F Tyler Harris, Windy City Bulls — G League affiliate of Chicago Bulls
G Ricardo Ledo, Wisconsin Herd — G League affiliate of Milwaukee Bucks
G Duke Mondy, Texas Legends — G League affiliate of Dallas Mavericks

Playing abroad
F Ben Bentil, Bilbao Basket
G Marshon Brooks, Guangdong Southern Tigers
G Bryce Cotton, Perth Wildcats
G Vincent Council, BC Nokia
G Sharaud Curry, Poitiers Basket 86
G Josh Fortune, SZTE-Szedeák
F Lee Goldsbrough, Manchester Magic
F Herbert Hill, Nishinomiya Storks
F Tuukka Kotti, Helsinki Seagulls
G Junior Lomomba, APOP Paphos B.C.
G Donnie McGrath, CB Sevilla
G Jeff Xavier, UJAP Quimper 29
  Alpha Diallo. Monaco Basket

All-time NBA draft
1960, Round 1, Pick 6: Lenny Wilkens (St. Louis Hawks)
1961, Round 2, Pick 12: Johnny Egan (Detroit Pistons)
1962, Round 3, Pick 25: Jim Hadnot (Boston Celtics)
1963, Round 4, Pick 33: Raymond Flynn (Syracuse Nats)
1963, Round 6, Pick 53: Vin Ernst (Boston Celtics)
1964, Round 3, Pick 27: John Thompson (Boston Celtics)
1967, Round 1, Pick 1: Jimmy Walker (Detroit Pistons)
1967, Round 5, Pick 44: Dexter Westbrook (Baltimore Bullets)
1967, Round 12, Pick 128: Mike Riordan (New York Knicks)
1971, Round 6, Pick 96: Jim Larranaga (Detroit Pistons)
1973, Round 1, Pick 3: Ernie DiGregorio (Buffalo Braves)
1973, Round 2, Pick 24: Kevin Stacom (Chicago Bulls)
1973, Round 5, Pick 71: Fran Costello (Portland Trail Blazers)
1974, Round 1, Pick 2: Marvin Barnes (Philadelphia 76ers)
1974, Round 2, Pick 35: Kevin Stacom (Boston Celtics)
1975, Round 9, Pick 154: Steve Strother (Houston Rockets)
1976, Round 8, Pick 136: Mark McAndrew (Buffalo Braves)
1977, Round 3, Pick 52: Joe Hassett (Seattle SuperSonics)
1977, Round 6, Pick 119: Bob Cooper (Kansas City Kings)
1978, Round 6, Pick 112: Bob Misevicius (Buffalo Braves)
1978, Round 8, Pick 153: Bruce Campbell (New Jersey Nets)
1979, Round 6, Pick 121: Dwight Williams (Atlanta Hawks)
1980, Round 10, Pick 214: John Nolan (Boston Celtics)
1981, Round 9, Pick 186: Rudy Williams (New Jersey Nets)
1983, Round 7, Pick 160: Ron Jackson (Boston Celtics)
1984, Round 1, Pick 9: Otis Thorpe (Kansas City Kings)
1985, Round 5, Pick 114: Ray Knight (Milwaukee Bucks)
1987, Round 3, Pick 68: Billy Donovan (Utah Jazz)
1990, Round 2, Pick 54: Abdul Shamsid-Deen (Seattle SuperSonics)
1991, Round 1, Pick 21: Eric Murdock (Utah Jazz)
1994, Round 1, Pick 21: Dickey Simpkins (Chicago Bulls)
1994, Round 2, Pick 35: Michael Smith (Sacramento Kings)
1995, Round 1, Pick 14: Eric Williams (Boston Celtics)
1995, Round 2, Pick 45: Troy Brown (Atlanta Hawks)
1997, Round 1, Pick 12: Austin Croshere (Indiana Pacers)
1997, Round 2, Pick 46: God Shammgod (Washington Wizards)
2004, Round 2, Pick 56: Marcus Douthit (Los Angeles Lakers)
2005, Round 2, Pick 50: Ryan Gomes (Boston Celtics)
2007, Round 2, Pick 55: Herbert Hill (Utah Jazz)
2011, Round 1, Pick 25: Marshon Brooks (Boston Celtics)
2013, Round 2, Pick 43: Ricardo Ledo (Milwaukee Bucks)
2016, Round 1, Pick 5: Kris Dunn (Minnesota Timberwolves)
2016, Round 2, Pick 51: Ben Bentil (Boston Celtics)

Former Friars
Justin Acker — Executive, WME/IMG
Chris Anrin — former international professional basketball player
Marvin Barnes — former NBA and ABA all-star player
Ira Bowman — former NBA player
Marques Bragg — former NBA player
Marshon Brooks — NBA player with New Jersey Nets
Derrick Brown — former international professional basketball player
Michael Brown — former international professional basketball player
Troy Brown — former NBA player
Marty Conlon — former NBA player
Rick Cordella — Vice President & General Manager, NBC Sports Digital
Austin Croshere — former NBA player
Sharaud Curry — international professional basketball player
Ernie DiGregorio — former NBA player
Billy Donovan — two-time NCAA Men's Division I Basketball Championship head coach of Florida Gators men's basketball
Marcus Douthit — NBA and international professional basketball player
Jacek Duda — former international professional basketball player
Weyinmi Efejuku — international professional basketball player
Johnny Egan — former NBA player and coach
Raymond Flynn — former Mayor of Boston
Trent Forbes — international professional basketball player
Rubén Garcés — former NBA and international professional basketball player
Ryan Gomes — NBA player with Los Angeles Clippers
Randall Hanke — international professional basketball player
Eric Harris — former international professional basketball player
Joe Hassett — former NBA player
Herbert Hill — NBA and international professional basketball player
Sheiku Kabba — international professional basketball player
Jonathan Kale — international professional basketball player
Tuukka Kotti — international professional basketball player
Ricky Ledo — current NBA player
Jim Larranaga — head coach of Miami Hurricanes men's basketball
Māris Ļaksa — international professional basketball player
John Linehan — international professional basketball player
Mike Malone — NBA head coach for the Denver Nuggets
Erron Maxey — international professional basketball player
Geoff McDermott — international professional basketball player
Ken McDonald — head coach of Western Kentucky Hilltopers men's basketball
Donnie McGrath — international professional basketball player
Brian McKenzie — international professional basketball player
Abdul Mills — former international professional basketball player
Eric Murdock — former NBA player
Jason Murdock — former international professional basketball player
Jamine Peterson — international professional basketball player
Rob Phelps — former international professional basketball player
Richard Pitino — head basketball coach for University of New Mexico
Mike Riordan — former NBA player
Rob Sanders — former international professional basketball player
Karim Shabazz — international professional basketball player
God Shammgod — former NBA player
Abdul Shamsid-Deen — former international professional basketball player
Dickey Simpkins — former NBA player
Kevin Simpson — former international professional basketball player
Michael Smith — former NBA player
Kevin Stacom — former NBA player
Piotr Szybilski — former international professional basketball player
Jamel Thomas — former NBA player
Garnett Thompson — international professional basketball player
John Thompson — former Basketball Hall of Fame head coach of Georgetown Hoyas men's basketball
Otis Thorpe — former NBA all-star player
Orlando Vega — former international professional basketball player
Jimmy Walker — former NBA all-star player
Franklin Western — international professional basketball player
Lenny Wilkens — Basketball Hall of Fame coach and player
Eric Williams — former NBA player
Jeff Xavier — international professional basketball player
Maciej Zieliński — former international professional basketball player

All-time leaders

Points

Rebounds

Assists

Steals

Blocks

Arena
The Providence Friars men's basketball team has been playing at the Amica Mutual Pavilion  (aka "the AMP") since its inception in 1972, having played almost all of its home basketball games at the arena since it opened. The Amica Mutual Pavilion (formerly Providence Civic Center and Dunkin’ Donuts Center ) is an indoor arena, located in downtown Providence, Rhode Island, and seats approximately 12,400 fans for basketball games.  In 2001, the arena was named the Dunkin' Donuts Center as part of a naming-rights deal with Dunkin' Donuts. In December 2005, the Rhode Island Convention Center Authority purchased the building from the city of Providence and spent $80 million on an extensive renovation.  Since the renovations, the arena has been touted as one of the most state of the art arenas and one of the best atmospheres in the NCAA.  Prior to playing at the Amica Mutual Pavilion , the Friars played at Alumni Hall (Providence) from 1955 until moving to the AMP in 1972.  Alumni Hall seated approximately 2,600 fans from 1955 until its renovation in 2012, and now seats approximately 1,850 fans. In 2022 Amica Mutual took over the naming rights and the arena was renamed the Amica Mutual Pavilion.

Rivalries

Villanova Wildcats 
The two smallest schools in the original Big East, Providence and the Villanova Wildcats, currently battle at least twice each year during conference play. The two teams first met on February 15, 1936, resulting in a 46–37 Friars victory. Villanova leads the all-time series, 59–38, as of the end of the 2015–16 NCAA basketball season. The rivalry is elevated by the Catholic orders which run the schools; Providence's Dominicans and Villanova's Augustinians.

Boston College Eagles 
These two former Big East rivals are in adjacent states with both teams said to have among the most intense fans in New England. Though they now reside in separate conferences, they still meet occasionally during non-conference play.

Connecticut Huskies 
The only two New England schools in the old Big East for its final eight seasons, these two schools fought for New England bragging rights each year until the 2013 season, when Providence and 6 other teams in the "Catholic 7" broke away to form the new Big East and UConn remained in the now-called American Athletic Conference. UConn joined the new Big East and started playing in the conference in 2020, renewing the rivalry.

Rhode Island Rams 

The annual Rhode Island State Championship game is played between these schools once a year and is considered often to be the highlight of the schedule for the Rams. The annual match-up is usually played in December and has produced many memorable games and moments for both teams over the years.

Participations in FIBA competitions
1977 FIBA Intercontinental Cup: 6th place

References

External links
Official website

 
Basketball teams established in 1921
1921 establishments in Rhode Island